General elections were held in Puerto Rico on 6 November 1956. Luis Muñoz Marín of the Popular Democratic Party was re-elected as governor, whilst the PPD also won a majority of the vote in the House of Representatives elections. Voter turnout was 80.4% in the gubernatorial elections and 80.3% in the House elections.

Results

Governor

House of Representatives

References

1956 elections in the Caribbean
1956
Elections
Puerto Rico